Bahavu Usanase Jeannette is a Rwandan actress. One of the most popular actresses in Rwanda, bahavu is best known for the role 'Diane' in TV series, City Maid. Apart from acting, she is also a fashion designer and television host. She is married with Ndayirukiye Fleury in March 27, 2021.

Personal life
She was born on July, 17 in Rwanda. Her mother was also a popular Rwandan actress.

She previously dated to Yverry. On July 17, 2020, Jeannette wore a ring with her boyfriend Ndayikingurukiye Fleury aka 'Legend' who met in 2015. The engagement was celebrated at Scheba Hotel Kiyovu.

Career
In 2019, she acted in the television serial City Maid with the role 'Diane'. Even though the character gained popularity, it was removed from the plot and a story released at the time shows that she was killed and dumped in Nyabarongo. After the drama, she joined with the film Twins in 2019. which is her project with her husband who is a producer.

she is known as Pamela in film called Inzozi series, directed by Muniru Habiyakare and  Felix kamanzi, it is produced by Ndayirukiye Fleury her husband and Rugwizangoga Tharcisse, this film is written for supporting marriage because in our days marriage is neither stronger than ever it's for the contribution of many people found in Rwandan cinema and journalist.

Apart from acting, she worked as a television host a Christian Celebrity Show which aired from 2pm on Christian TV.

Filmography

References

External links
 Diane wakinaga muri City Maid yambitswe impeta y’urukundo
 ibyamamare muri cinema nyarwanda, bagiye batsindira ibihembo muri "Rwanda International Movie Awards

Rwandan actresses
Living people
Year of birth missing (living people)
People from Kigali